is a Japanese sailor.

Early life and education
Takano was born on March 1, 1998, in Osaka Prefecture, Japan. She began her studies at Kansai University.

Athletic career
At the 2019 World Championships, she placed 20th. At the qualifying competition, her score was among the highest in Japan, and she was nominated to the Japanese national team.

At age 18, she participated in the 2016 Summer Olympics, becoming the youngest Japanese sailor to participate in the Olympic Games. Along with Keiko Miyagawa, she placed 20th in the 49erFX event.

References

1998 births
Living people
Kansai University alumni
Japanese female sailors (sport)
Olympic sailors of Japan
Sailors at the 2016 Summer Olympics – 49er FX
Sailors at the 2014 Asian Games
Asian Games competitors for Japan
Sailors at the 2020 Summer Olympics – 49er FX